The Biggest Loser Asia is the Asian version of the competitive reality television series The Biggest Loser. It had two seasons:

The Biggest Loser Asia (season 1), the first season of The Biggest Loser Asia, aired on Hallmark Channel
The Biggest Loser Asia (season 2), the second season of The Biggest Loser Asia, aired on Diva Universal

Asia
Non-American television series based on American television series